The Scunthorpe Scorpions are a speedway team in the British SGB Championship. They have raced at various times since 1972, at three different venues.

History

1972–1978
The original Scunthorpe side were known as Scunthorpe Saints from 1972 to 1978, when they rode at Quibell Park Stadium on Brumby Wood Lane, the seven years in division 2 were unspectacular finishing in a best position of 13th place.

1979–1985
In 1979, a change of venue and name took place, they were renamed the Scunthorpe Stags and rode at Ashby Ville. The team continued to compete in the second division and continued to produce moderate results. The best placing was a 5th place finish during the 1983 National League season. During the 1985 season the team were disbanded in May.

2005–2007

In 2005, speedway returned to Scunthorpe, with the Scunthorpe Scorpions taking their place in division 3 (the 2005 Speedway Conference League). The following season the Scorpions won their first silverware, winning the playoffs after finishing second in the regular season table. The team also won the Knockout Cup to win the double. The 2007 Speedway Conference League resulted in a second successive league and cup double. The team was inspired by Tai Woffinden who would later become a three times world champion.

2008–2012
After three successful years in the Conference League the side were accepted into the Premier League (division 2) for 2008. At the same time the club introduced a junior side called the Saints (after the original name of the club) who would continue riding in the Conference League and later the National League with the main aim to develop riders for the Premier League side. In 2012, the Scorpions won their highest honour to date, winning the Premier League after defeating the Somerset Rebels 92-91 on aggregate in the play off final.

2013–present
The Scorpions continue to race in tier/division 2 (currently the SGB Championship) entering their 15th season in the division in 2023.

Season summary (1st team)

Season summary (junior team)

Riders previous seasons 

2007 team

2008 team (juniors)

2008 team

2009 team

Also rode:

2009 team (juniors)

2010 team

Number eight rider:

2015 team

2016 team

Also rode:

2017 team

Also rode:

Replaced the injured Fritz Wallner

2019 team

 Josh Auty
 Jake Allen
 Ben Barker
 Danny Ayres
 Stefan Nielsen
 Simon Lambert
 Ryan Kinsley

2021 team

 (C)

Also Rode

2022 team

 (C)

Also Rode

Other honours 
Lincolnshire Cup Winners: 2005, 2006 & 2007
Easter Cup Winners: 2006
Humber Bridge Trophy Winners: 2005

References

Speedway Premier League teams
SGB Championship teams
Sport in Scunthorpe